Athens B (Athens Beta) was a parliamentary constituency in Attica represented in the Hellenic Parliament. It covered a large part of urban area of Athens outside the Municipality of Athens, which forms the Athens A constituency. It was established in 1958, to separate the working-class districts from central Athens and reduce the electoral power of the then United Democratic Left, and was abolished in 2018.

As of September 2015, with 1.4 million registered voters, Athens B elected 44 Members of Parliament (MPs)  by reinforced proportional representation and was the largest constituency in Greece. For this reason it was broken up in December 2018 into Athens B1 (North), Athens B2 (West), and Athens B3 (South).

Election results

Legislative election

Members of Parliament

Members of the Hellenic Parliament, September 2015 – June 2019

The following 44 MPs were elected in the September 2015 legislative election:

Members of the Hellenic Parliament, January – September 2015

The following MPs had been elected in the January 2015 legislative election:

Members of the Hellenic Parliament, June 2012 – January 2015

Notes and references

External links
   Results and Elected MPs for the September 2015 Election in Athens B constituency (from the website of the Hellenic Ministry of Interior)

Parliamentary constituencies of Greece
1958 establishments in Greece
Constituencies established in 1958
Politics of Athens